Vettaikaaran or Vettaikkaran is a word in the Tamil language, meaning "hunter". It may refer to:

 Vettaikkaran (1964 film), starring MGR and Savitri
 Vettaikaaran (2009 film), starring Vijay and Anushka Shetty